Meester Kikker is a 2016 Dutch family film directed by Anna van der Heide. It was based on the book of the same name by Paul van Loon. It was listed as one of eleven films that could be selected as the Dutch submission for the Best Foreign Language Film at the 89th Academy Awards, but it was not nominated.

Cast
 Jeroen Spitzenberger
 Georgina Verbaan
 Yenthe Bos
 Ryan Freijzer

References

External links
 

2016 films
Dutch children's films
2010s Dutch-language films